Ruwa Romman (born circa 1993) is a Palestinian–American politician. In 2022, she became the first Muslim woman to be elected to the Georgia State House of Representatives.

Romman was born in Jordan and moved to the United States when she was 7. Romman attended Oglethorpe University and Georgetown University’s McCourt School of Public Policy. She graduated from McCourt with a Master's degree in Public Policy in 2019. After graduation, she worked for Deloitte as a senior consultant. Romman has been involved in local politics and civic engagement groups since 2014. 

In 2020, Romman co-founded the Georgia Volunteer Hub, which trained thousands of volunteers to support the Georgia Senate Runoff election. 

In January 2022, she announced her candidacy to become the Georgia House of Representative for District 97. On May 24, 2022, Romman won the Democratic primary against Democrat JT Wu for Georgia House District 97. On November 8, 2022, Romman won the general election for Georgia House District 97 against Republican John Chan, making her the first Muslim woman to be elected into the Georgia State House of Representatives.

During her 2022 campaign, Romman was endorsed by NARAL, Fair Fight, the Georgia Working Families Party, and the Asian-American Advocacy Fund. Romman campaigned on expanding health care access, protecting voting rights, supporting access to abortion and helping working families. 

On November 22, 2022, Romman was interviewed by Journalist Peter Biello for Georgia Public Boadcasting. In December 2022, Romman was interviewed by Geoff Bennett for a PBS NewsHour segment titled "How Muslim American candidates made history in the midterms" 

Since November 2022, Romman is part of Georgia's first formal "Legislative Asian American Pacific Islander Caucus."

References

External links 

 Ballotpedia Profile

American people of Palestinian descent
Oglethorpe University alumni
McCourt School of Public Policy alumni
Georgia (U.S. state) Democrats
Deloitte people
Jordanian emigrants to the United States
21st-century American politicians
21st-century American women politicians
Women in Georgia (U.S. state) politics
Candidates in the 2022 United States elections
Living people
Year of birth missing (living people)